Megesi (also Romanized as Megesī and Magasī) is a village in Halil Rural District, in the Central District of Jiroft County, Kerman Province, Iran. At the 2006 census, its population was 310, in 63 families.

References 

Populated places in Jiroft County